The Chief of Defence Forces, previously known as the Supreme Commander, is the overall field commander of the Royal Thai Armed Forces. He is also in charge of managing the Royal Thai Armed Forces Headquarters (abbreviated as the RTARF HQ). Not to be confused with the ceremonial Head of the Royal Thai Armed Forces who is the constitutional Head of State and Monarch of Thailand.

Prior to 1960 the post was an ad hoc creation by Field Marshal Plaek Phibunsongkhram, during World War II. However, under Field Marshal Sarit Thanarat the position became permanent, and in its early life was even combined with the post of Prime Minister of Thailand. In February 2008 the English name of the post was changed from Supreme Commander to Chief of Defence Forces with the reorganization of the Supreme Command Headquarters into the Royal Thai Armed Forces Headquarters (though the Thai term remained the same). 

The enactment of 1997 Constitution of Thailand on 11 October 1997 prohibits double-hatting of this position and each service branch commander-in-chief, the general officer appointed to the Chief of Defence Forces after the date acts more like a coordinator between three military branches. Still, he commands smaller military force than the Army, the Navy, or the Air Force has. So, the position is usually reserved for senior army generals who will not be appointed as the Commander-in-Chief of the Royal Thai Army and will retire on the same year with the latter. It is customary to appoint the chief of defence to four-star rank in all three branches in the Armed Forces for inspection of other branches of the Armed Forces.

The current commander is General Chalermpol Srisawat since October 2020.

List of chiefs

Supreme Commanders (1941−2008)

|-style="text-align:center;"
|colspan=7|Temporary command during the Franco-Thai War
|-

|-style="text-align:center;"
|colspan=7|Temporary command during the Pacific War
|-

|-style="text-align:center;"
|colspan=7|Permanent command
|-

Chiefs of Defence Forces (2008−present)

See also
Royal Thai Armed Forces
Head of the Royal Thai Armed Forces
List of commanders-in-chief of the Royal Thai Army
List of commanders-in-chief of the Royal Thai Navy
List of commanders-in-chief of the Royal Thai Air Force

References
Former commander (Thai)

 
Military of Thailand
Chiefs of Defence
Thailand